Paraminabea aldersladei is a species of soft coral in the family Alcyoniidae. It is found in the central Indo-Pacific. This coral looks like an upside down carrot growing out of the substrate. Its striking white polyps are extended only at night to feed.

References

Animals described in 1992
Alcyoniidae